Jacques Alingue (born April 30, 1988) is a Chadian-French professional basketball player for JDA Dijon Basket of the LNB Pro A.

In 2013–14, he averaged 8.9 points, 8 rebounds, 1.7 assist and 1.7 steals per game for BC Souffelweyersheim in the Pro B. In June 2014 he signed with JDA Dijon. He moved to Hyères-Toulon for the playoffs in 2015 but rejoined Dijon the following season. Alingue posted 7 points and 4 rebounds per game in 2015–16. After the season he re-signed with Dijon. He was injured in 2018.

On May 21, 2020, he has signed with JDA Dijon Basket of the LNB Pro A.

Chad national team 
Alingue has represented Chad internationally.

References 

1988 births
Living people
Centers (basketball)
Chadian men's basketball players
French men's basketball players
HTV Basket players
JDA Dijon Basket players
Le Mans Sarthe Basket players
Power forwards (basketball)
SIG Basket players
Sportspeople from Manche